Vladan Nikolic is a Serbian independent film director, screenwriter and film producer.

Biography
Nikolic has taught film directing, production, and digital filmmaking classes at various universities, including New York University. He is Dean of the School of Media Studies at The New School.

His book "Independent Filmmaking and Digital Convergence - Transmedia and Beyond" was published by Routledge/Focal Press in 2017.

His awards include the TV Sarajevo Award and Zeta Film Award for Best Screenplay, Telluride Indiefest Best Film Award, and Tiburon International Film Festival Golden Reel Award. His feature film Love premiered at the Venice and Tribeca film festivals to critical acclaim and went on to win awards at film festivals in Geneva, Switzerland, and Barcelona, Spain. His subsequent film Zenith, incorporated an extensive transmedia project, expanding the film over multiple platforms, including theatrical, video, and online releases.

Filmography

Burn (2001) – writer, director, producer
Going Under (2004) – producer
Love (2005) – writer, director, producer
Fire Under the Snow (2008) – producer
Here and There (2009) – producer
Zenith (2010) – writer, director, producer
Allure (2014) – director, producer
Bourek (2015) - writer, director
Most Beautiful Island (2017) - consulting producer
The Drummer (2021) - producer

References

External links 
 

1965 births
Serbian film directors
The New School faculty
New York University faculty
Living people
Television people from Belgrade